The 5th Filmfare Awards Bangla ceremony, presented by The Times Group, honor the best Bengali language Indian films of 2020–2021. The nominations were announced on 14 March 2022. The ceremony was held on 17 March 2022 in Kolkata. Borunbabur Bondhu and Tonic shared the award for Best Film. The Award Show was aired on 24 and 30 April 2022 on Zee Bangla and Zee Bangla Cinema respectively. The show was hosted by Abir Chatterjee, Sohini Sarkar and Anirban Bhattacharya.

References

Filmfare Awards
F
March 2022 events in India
Events of The Times Group